Lincoln Hough (born June 17, 1982) is an American politician. He was first elected to the Missouri House of Representatives in 2010, where he served three terms. He served as Greene County Commissioner from 2016 to 2018. In November 2018, he was elected to represent the 30th District, which includes the City of Springfield in Greene County, in the Missouri Senate.

Senator Hough is a graduate of Missouri State University with a B.S. in political science. He also owns and operates a family cattle ranch, which he started more than 20 years ago. Senator Hough is a former member of the State Board of Missouri Cattleman's Association and a current board member of the Greene County Farm Bureau. For the past several years, Sen. Hough has also enjoyed serving as a volunteer for the Springfield chapter of Big Brothers/Big Sisters. Senator Hough also brings experience from his service as a member of the Missouri House of Representatives and his leadership on Transportation and Budget Committees.

Electoral history

State Representative

Greene County Commission

State Senate

References

1982 births
21st-century American politicians
Living people
Republican Party Missouri state senators
Republican Party members of the Missouri House of Representatives